SharpMusique was a rewrite in C# of PyMusique (written in Python), both programs were iTunes Music Store clients, allowing songs to be downloaded from the iTunes Music Store without DRM.

PyMusique

PyMusique was written by Travis Watkins, Cody Brocious, and Jon Lech Johansen for the purpose of allowing downloading songs from the iTunes Music Store before DRM was applied to them from a Mac, Linux, or Windows computer.  It was first released via Johansen's website on March 18, 2005. Although the iTunes Music Store's method of applying FairPlay DRM to the songs was widely known, PyMusique was the first program to exploit a loophole in the system, allowing users to download songs without the DRM restriction.  On March 22, 2005, Apple released an update that rendered PyMusique non-functional. The same day, a new version of PyMusique was released that worked again, only without Windows compatibility.  On March 31, 2005, Johansen released SharpMusique, the Windows-compatible port of PyMusique.

PyMusique also allowed songs to be re-downloaded for free, in case a user accidentally deleted their purchase.  Within a number of days, Apple broke the client by forcing all users to upgrade to iTunes 4.9.  In response to Apple's actions, Johansen released PyMusique version 0.4 on March 22, 2005 , which allows users once again to use PyMusique with Apple's store.

With the launch of 0.4, developer Cody Brocious stated on his blog that no future versions of PyMusique would be released with Microsoft Windows support.

SharpMusique

In September 2005, Jon Lech Johansen released SharpMusique, written in C#, which took over where PyMusique left off.  The program was kept updated until version 1.0, at which point it was no longer updated.  The iTunes protocol changed, and users of SharpMusique were able to release primitive patches to account for the changes until mid-2006, when the protocol changed drastically.  Around this time, without public announcement, the download links for SharpMusique and its source were removed from Johansen's website. As a result, it is no longer easily available.

References

External links
 Forbes.com article on Cody Brocious and PyMusique
 Neowin.net interview with Cody Brocious[Broken link]
 SharpMusique with links deep in the comments to source packages for linux and windows

Free multimedia software
ITunes
Digital rights management circumvention software